This is a list of butterflies of Kenya. About 559 species are known from Kenya, 34 of which are endemic.

Papilionidae

Papilioninae

Papilionini
 Papilio chrapkowskii Ernst Suffert, 1904
 Papilio desmondi desmondi van Someren, 1939
 Papilio desmondi teita van Someren, 1960
 Papilio hornimani Distant, 1879
 Papilio cynorta Fabricius, 1793
 Papilio constantinus constantinus Ward, 1871
 Papilio constantinus lecerfi Koçak, 1996
 Papilio echerioides joiceyi Gabriel, 1945
 Papilio echerioides kiellandi Clifton & Collins, 1997
 Papilio echerioides nyiro Carcasson, 1962
 Papilio echerioides wertheri Karsch, 1898
 Papilio nobilis nobilis Rogenhofer, 1891
 Papilio nobilis crippsianus Stoneham, 1936
 Papilio lormieri Distant, 1874
 Papilio ophidicephalus Oberthür, 1878
 Papilio phorcas roscoei Cramer, 1775

Leptocercini
 Graphium antheus (Cramer, 1779)
 Graphium kirbyi (Hewitson, 1872)
 Graphium polistratus (Grose-Smith, 1889)
 Graphium colonna (Ward, 1873)
 Graphium porthaon porthaon (Hewitson, 1865)
 Graphium porthaon mackiei Collins & Larsen, 1991
 Graphium philonoe philonoe (Ward, 1873)
 Graphium philonoe whalleyi (Talbot, 1929)

Pieridae

Coliadinae
 Eurema floricola leonis (Butler, 1886)

Pierinae
 Colotis antevippe zera (Lucas, 1852)
 Colotis aurigineus (Butler, 1883)
 Colotis aurora evarne (Klug, 1829)
 Colotis auxo (Lucas, 1852)
 Colotis celimene (Lucas, 1852)
 Colotis chrysonome (Klug, 1829)
 Colotis daira jacksoni (Sharpe, 1890)
 Colotis daira stygia (Felder & Felder, 1865)
 Colotis danae eupompe (Klug, 1829)
 Colotis danae pseudacaste (Butler, 1876)
 Colotis eunoma flotowi (Suffert, 1904)
 Colotis evagore antigone (Boisduval, 1836)
 Colotis evenina casta (Gerstaecker, 1871)
 Colotis evenina sipylus (Swinhoe, 1884)
 Colotis evenina xantholeuca (Sharpe, 1904)
 Colotis halimede restricta Talbot, 1939
 Colotis hetaera hetaera (Gerstaecker, 1871)
 Colotis hetaera lorti (Sharpe, 1896)
 Colotis hildebrandtii (Staudinger, 1884)
 Colotis incretus (Butler, 1881)
 Colotis phisadia rothschildi (Sharpe, 1898)
 Colotis phisadia vagus d'Abrera, 1980
 Colotis pleione heliocaustus (Butler, 1886)
 Colotis protomedia (Klug, 1829)
 Colotis regina (Trimen, 1863)
 Colotis rogersi (Dixey, 1915)
 Colotis venosa (Staudinger, 1885)
 Colotis vesta catachrysops (Butler, 1878)
 Colotis vesta hanningtoni (Butler, 1883)
 Colotis vestalis castalis (Staudinger, 1884)
 Eronia leda (Boisduval, 1847)
 Pinacopterix eriphia melanarge (Butler, 1886)
 Nepheronia buquetii (Boisduval, 1836)

Pierini
 Appias lasti (Grose-Smith, 1889)
 Appias phaola isokani (Grose-Smith, 1889)
 Pontia distorta (Butler, 1886)
 Pontia glauconome Klug, 1829
 Pontia helice johnstonii (Crowley, 1887)
 Mylothris agathina (Cramer, 1779)
 Mylothris jacksoni jacksoni Sharpe, 1891
 Mylothris jacksoni cephisus Talbot, 1946
 Mylothris jacksoni sagitta Clifton, 1980
 Mylothris kilimensis Kielland, 1990
 Mylothris kiwuensis rhodopoides Talbot, 1944
 Mylothris sagala narcissus Butler, 1888
 Mylothris sagala neumanni Sharpe, 1896
 Mylothris schumanni Suffert, 1904
 Dixeia charina liliana (Grose-Smith, 1889)
 Dixeia charina pulverulenta (Dixey, 1929)
 Dixeia doxo costata Talbot, 1943
 Dixeia orbona vidua (Butler, 1900)
 Dixeia pigea (Boisduval, 1836)
 Dixeia spilleri (Spiller, 1884)
 Belenois gidica abyssinica (Lucas, 1852)
 Belenois margaritacea margaritacea Sharpe, 1891
 Belenois margaritacea somereni (Talbot, 1928)
 Belenois margaritacea kenyensis (Joicey & Talbot, 1927)
 Belenois rubrosignata peeli Dixey, 1900
 Belenois solilucis loveni (Aurivillius, 1921)
 Belenois zochalia (Boisduval, 1836)

Lycaenidae

Miletinae

Liphyrini
 Aslauga orientalis Cottrell, 1981
 Aslauga purpurascens Holland, 1890

Miletini
 Lachnocnema bibulus (Fabricius, 1793)
 Lachnocnema pseudobibulus Libert, 1996
 Lachnocnema sosia Libert, 1996
 Lachnocnema durbani Trimen & Bowker, 1887
 Lachnocnema emperamus (Snellen, 1872)
 Lachnocnema divergens Gaede, 1915
 Lachnocnema vuattouxi Libert, 1996
 Lachnocnema dohertyi Libert, 1996

Poritiinae

Liptenini
 Alaena amazoula nyasana Hawker-Smith, 1933
 Alaena johanna johanna Sharpe, 1890
 Alaena johanna tsavoa Jackson, 1966
 Alaena ngonga Jackson, 1966
 Alaena picata Sharpe, 1896
 Pentila pauli Staudinger, 1888
 Pentila rogersi (Druce, 1907)
 Pentila tachyroides Dewitz, 1879
 Pentila tropicalis chyulu van Someren, 1939
 Pentila tropicalis mombasae (Grose-Smith & Kirby, 1889)
 Ornipholidotos katangae Stempffer, 1947
 Ornipholidotos amieti angulata Libert, 2005
 Ornipholidotos peucetia peuceda (Grose-Smith, 1889)
 Mimacraea krausei Dewitz, 1889
 Mimacraea marshalli marshalli Trimen, 1898
 Mimacraea marshalli dohertyi Rothschild, 1901
 Mimeresia dinora (Kirby, 1890)
 Liptena kiellandi Congdon & Collins, 1998
 Tetrarhanis ilma (Hewitson, 1873)
 Tetrarhanis stempfferi kigezi (Stempffer, 1956)
 Pseuderesia mapongua (Holland, 1893)
 Eresina crola Talbot, 1935
 Teriomima subpunctata Kirby, 1887
 Teriomima micra (Grose-Smith, 1898)
 Teriomima parva Hawker-Smith, 1933
 Baliochila hildegarda (Kirby, 1887)
 Baliochila dubiosa Stempffer & Bennett, 1953
 Baliochila minima (Hawker-Smith, 1933)
 Baliochila amanica Stempffer & Bennett, 1953
 Baliochila latimarginata (Hawker-Smith, 1933)
 Baliochila lipara Stempffer & Bennett, 1953
 Baliochila confusa Henning & Henning, 2004
 Baliochila fragilis Stempffer & Bennett, 1953
 Baliochila stygia Stempffer & Bennett, 1953
 Cnodontes vansomereni Stempffer & Bennett, 1953
 Eresinopsides bichroma jefferyi Stempffer, 1950

Epitolini
 Iridana tororo Stempffer, 1964
 Cerautola miranda vidua (Talbot, 1935)
 Cephetola mengoensis (Bethune-Baker, 1906)
 Cephetola orientalis (Roche, 1954)
 Deloneura ochrascens ochrascens (Neave, 1904)
 Deloneura ochrascens littoralis Talbot, 1935
 Neaveia lamborni Druce, 1910
 Hewitsonia inexpectata Bouyer, 1997

Aphnaeinae
 Lipaphnaeus leonina (Sharpe, 1890)
 Chloroselas azurea Butler, 1900
 Chloroselas esmeralda Butler, 1886
 Chloroselas minima Jackson, 1966
 Chloroselas pseudozeritis pseudozeritis (Trimen, 1873)
 Chloroselas pseudozeritis umbrosa Jackson, 1966
 Chloroselas trembathi Collins & Larsen, 1991
 Chloroselas vansomereni Jackson, 1966
 Vansomerenia rogersi (Riley, 1932)
 Cigaritis apelles (Oberthür, 1878)
 Cigaritis ella (Hewitson, 1865)
 Cigaritis mozambica (Bertoloni, 1850)
 Cigaritis nairobiensis (Sharpe, 1904)
 Cigaritis nilus (Hewitson, 1865)
 Cigaritis somalina (Butler, 1886)
 Cigaritis tavetensis (Lathy, 1906)
 Cigaritis victoriae (Butler, 1884)
 Zeritis neriene Boisduval, 1836
 Axiocerses tjoane (Wallengren, 1857)
 Axiocerses collinsi Henning & Henning, 1996
 Axiocerses punicea (Grose-Smith, 1889)
 Axiocerses jacksoni Stempffer, 1948
 Aloeides conradsi angoniensis Tite & Dickson, 1973
 Aloeides conradsi talboti Tite & Dickson, 1973
 Aphnaeus coronae littoralis Carcasson, 1964
 Aphnaeus hutchinsonii Trimen & Bowker, 1887
 Aphnaeus jacksoni Stempffer, 1954
 Aphnaeus neavei Bethune-Baker, 1926
 Aphnaeus williamsi Carcasson, 1964

Theclinae
 Myrina dermaptera nyassae Talbot, 1935
 Myrina silenus ficedula Trimen, 1879
 Myrina subornata kacheleba d'Abrera, 1980
 Hypolycaena buxtoni rogersi Bethune-Baker, 1924
 Hypolycaena obscura Stempffer, 1947
 Hypolycaena pachalica Butler, 1888
 Hypolycaena philippus (Fabricius, 1793)
 Hemiolaus caeculus littoralis Stempffer, 1954
 Leptomyrina hirundo (Wallengren, 1857)
 Leptomyrina gorgias cana Talbot, 1935
 Leptomyrina gorgias sobrina Talbot, 1935
 Iolaus bolissus Hewitson, 1873
 Iolaus alienus ugandae Stempffer, 1953
 Iolaus apatosa (Stempffer, 1952)
 Iolaus arborifera (Butler, 1901)
 Iolaus bansana Bethune-Baker, 1926
 Iolaus bellina (Plötz, 1880)
 Iolaus diametra diametra (Karsch, 1895)
 Iolaus diametra littoralis (Congdon & Collins, 1998)
 Iolaus hemicyanus Sharpe, 1904
 Iolaus iasis Hewitson, 1865
 Iolaus jacksoni (Stempffer, 1950)
 Iolaus mermis (Druce, 1896)
 Iolaus mimosae haemus (Talbot, 1935)
 Iolaus mimosae rhodosense (Stempffer & Bennett, 1959)
 Iolaus pollux Aurivillius, 1895
 Iolaus sibella (Druce, 1910)
 Iolaus silanus Grose-Smith, 1889
 Iolaus tajoraca tajoraca Walker, 1870
 Iolaus tajoraca ertli Aurivillius, 1916
 Iolaus umbrosa (Butler, 1886)
 Iolaus pallene (Wallengren, 1857)
 Iolaus menas tatiana (d'Abrera, 1980)
 Iolaus crawshayi crawshayi (Butler, 1901)
 Iolaus crawshayi elgonae (Stempffer & Bennett, 1958)
 Iolaus crawshayi littoralis (Stempffer & Bennett, 1958)
 Iolaus crawshayi maureli Dufrane, 1954
 Iolaus crawshayi nyanzae (Stempffer & Bennett, 1958)
 Iolaus lalos (Druce, 1896)
 Iolaus maritimus (Stempffer & Bennett, 1958)
 Iolaus silarus Druce, 1885
 Iolaus poultoni (Riley, 1928)
 Iolaus catori Bethune-Baker, 1904
 Stugeta bowkeri kedonga van Someren, 1939
 Stugeta bowkeri mombasae Butler, 1901
 Stugeta bowkeri nyanzana Wichgraf, 1911
 Stugeta carpenteri Stempffer, 1946
 Stugeta marmoreus olalae Stoneham, 1934
 Stugeta somalina Stempffer, 1946
 Pilodeudorix obscurata (Trimen, 1891)
 Pilodeudorix camerona (Plötz, 1880)
 Pilodeudorix congoana (Aurivillius, 1923)
 Paradeudorix ituri ugandae (Talbot, 1935)
 Deudorix dariaves Hewitson, 1877
 Deudorix dinochares Grose-Smith, 1887
 Deudorix diocles Hewitson, 1869
 Deudorix ecaudata Gifford, 1963
 Deudorix jacksoni Talbot, 1935
 Deudorix livia (Klug, 1834)
 Deudorix suk Stempffer, 1948
 Deudorix vansomereni Stempffer, 1951
 Capys calpurnia Henning & Henning, 1988
 Capys catharus rileyi Stempffer, 1967
 Capys collinsi Henning & Henning, 1988
 Capys cupreus Henning & Henning, 1988
 Capys hermes Henning & Henning, 1988
 Capys juliae Henning & Henning, 1988
 Capys meruensis Henning & Henning, 1988

Lycaeninae
 Lycaena phlaeas abbottii (Holland, 1892)

Polyommatinae

Lycaenesthini
 Anthene amarah (Guérin-Méneville, 1849)
 Anthene bjoernstadi Collins & Larsen, 1991
 Anthene butleri butleri (Oberthür, 1880)
 Anthene butleri galla Stempffer, 1947
 Anthene butleri stempfferi Storace, 1954
 Anthene contrastata mashuna (Stevenson, 1937)
 Anthene contrastata turkana Stempffer, 1936
 Anthene hobleyi hobleyi (Neave, 1904)
 Anthene hobleyi elgonensis (Aurivillius, 1925)
 Anthene hobleyi teita Stempffer, 1961
 Anthene hodsoni hodsoni (Talbot, 1935)
 Anthene hodsoni usamba (Talbot, 1937)
 Anthene janna Gabriel, 1949
 Anthene kersteni (Gerstaecker, 1871)
 Anthene lasti (Grose-Smith & Kirby, 1894)
 Anthene lemnos loa (Strand, 1911)
 Anthene minima (Trimen, 1893)
 Anthene opalina Stempffer, 1946
 Anthene otacilia dulcis (Pagenstecher, 1902)
 Anthene rothschildi (Aurivillius, 1922)
 Anthene rubricinctus (Holland, 1891)
 Anthene talboti Stempffer, 1936
 Anthene wilsoni (Talbot, 1935)
 Anthene staudingeri obsoleta (Stempffer, 1947)
 Anthene kimboza (Kielland, 1990)
 Anthene lamias (Hewitson, 1878)
 Anthene nigeriae (Aurivillius, 1905)

Polyommatini
 Cupidopsis jobates (Hopffer, 1855)
 Pseudonacaduba aethiops (Mabille, 1877)
 Uranothauma heritsia (Hewitson, 1876)
 Uranothauma nubifer (Trimen, 1895)
 Uranothauma vansomereni Stempffer, 1951
 Phlyaria cyara (Hewitson, 1876)
 Cacyreus tespis (Herbst, 1804)
 Harpendyreus aequatorialis (Sharpe, 1892)
 Harpendyreus marungensis (Joicey & Talbot, 1924)
 Leptotes adamsoni Collins & Larsen, 1991
 Leptotes babaulti (Stempffer, 1935)
 Leptotes brevidentatus (Tite, 1958)
 Leptotes jeanneli (Stempffer, 1935)
 Leptotes marginalis (Stempffer, 1944)
 Leptotes pulchra (Murray, 1874)
 Tuxentius calice gregorii (Butler, 1894)
 Tuxentius cretosus cretosus (Butler, 1876)
 Tuxentius cretosus usemia (Neave, 1904)
 Tuxentius melaena (Trimen & Bowker, 1887)
 Tarucus grammicus (Grose-Smith & Kirby, 1893)
 Tarucus kulala Evans, 1955
 Tarucus legrasi Stempffer, 1948
 Tarucus rosacea (Austaut, 1885)
 Tarucus theophrastus (Fabricius, 1793)
 Tarucus ungemachi Stempffer, 1942
 Zintha hintza (Trimen, 1864)
 Zizina antanossa (Mabille, 1877)
 Actizera lucida (Trimen, 1883)
 Azanus ubaldus (Stoll, 1782)
 Eicochrysops distractus (de Joannis & Verity, 1913)
 Eicochrysops masai (Bethune-Baker, 1905)
 Eicochrysops messapus (Godart, 1824)
 Eicochrysops rogersi Bethune-Baker, 1924
 Euchrysops albistriata (Capronnier, 1889)
 Euchrysops barkeri (Trimen, 1893)
 Euchrysops brunneus Bethune-Baker, 1923
 Euchrysops horus (Stoneham, 1938)
 Euchrysops kabrosae (Bethune-Baker, 1906)
 Euchrysops malathana (Boisduval, 1833)
 Euchrysops mauensis Bethune-Baker, 1923
 Euchrysops nilotica (Aurivillius, 1904)
 Euchrysops osiris (Hopffer, 1855)
 Euchrysops severini Hulstaert, 1924
 Euchrysops subpallida Bethune-Baker, 1923
 Thermoniphas colorata (Ungemach, 1932)
 Oboronia bueronica Karsch, 1895
 Oboronia guessfeldti (Dewitz, 1879)
 Chilades naidina (Butler, 1886)
 Freyeria trochylus (Freyer, [1843])
 Lepidochrysops kitale (Stempffer, 1936)
 Lepidochrysops desmondi Stempffer, 1951
 Lepidochrysops elgonae elgonae Stempffer, 1950
 Lepidochrysops elgonae moyo van Someren, 1957
 Lepidochrysops jansei van Someren, 1957
 Lepidochrysops kocak Seven, 1997
 Lepidochrysops loveni (Aurivillius, 1922)
 Lepidochrysops lukenia van Someren, 1957
 Lepidochrysops neonegus neonegus (Bethune-Baker, [1923])
 Lepidochrysops neonegus borealis van Someren, 1957
 Lepidochrysops peculiaris peculiaris (Rogenhofer, 1891)
 Lepidochrysops peculiaris hypoleucus (Butler, 1893)
 Lepidochrysops polydialecta (Bethune-Baker, [1923])
 Lepidochrysops pterou pterou (Bethune-Baker, [1923])
 Lepidochrysops pterou suk van Someren, 1957
 Lepidochrysops victoriae vansomereni Stempffer, 1951

Nymphalidae

Danainae

Danaini
 Danaus dorippus (Klug, 1845)
 Amauris crawshayi Butler, 1897
 Amauris ellioti altumi van Someren, 1936
 Amauris ellioti ansorgei Sharpe, 1896
 Amauris ochlea ochlea (Boisduval, 1847)
 Amauris ochlea darius Rothschild & Jordan, 1903

Satyrinae

Melanitini
 Aphysoneura pigmentaria kiellandi Congdon & Collins, 1998
 Aphysoneura pigmentaria pringlei (Sharpe, 1894)
 Aphysoneura scapulifascia collinsi Kielland, 1989

Satyrini
 Bicyclus angulosa (Butler, 1868)
 Bicyclus anynana (Butler, 1879)
 Bicyclus auricruda fulgidus Fox, 1963
 Bicyclus campina carcassoni Condamin, 1963
 Bicyclus campina ocelligera (Strand, 1910)
 Bicyclus ena (Hewitson, 1877)
 Bicyclus kenia (Rogenhofer, 1891)
 Bicyclus milyas (Hewitson, 1864)
 Bicyclus pavonis (Butler, 1876)
 Heteropsis phaea (Karsch, 1894)
 Heteropsis teratia (Karsch, 1894)
 Heteropsis peitho (Plötz, 1880)
 Ypthima condamini Kielland, 1982
 Ypthima asterope (Klug, 1832) - common three ring
 Ypthima impura paupera Ungemach, 1932
 Ypthima jacksoni Kielland, 1982
 Ypthima pupillaris Butler, 1888
 Ypthima rhodesiana Carcasson, 1961
 Ypthima yatta Kielland, 1982
 Neocoenyra duplex Butler, 1886
 Neocoenyra fulleborni Thurau, 1903
 Neocoenyra masaica Carcasson, 1958
 Coenyropsis carcassoni Kielland, 1976
 Physcaeneura leda (Gerstaecker, 1871)
 Neita victoriae (Aurivillius, 1899)

Charaxinae

Charaxini
 Charaxes varanes (Cramer, 1777)
 Charaxes acuminatus kulalae van Someren, 1975
 Charaxes acuminatus oreas Talbot, 1932
 Charaxes acuminatus shimbanus van Someren, 1963
 Charaxes acuminatus teitensis van Someren, 1963
 Charaxes protoclea azota (Hewitson, 1877)
 Charaxes macclounii Butler, 1895
 Charaxes lasti Grose-Smith, 1889
 Charaxes jasius Poulton, 1926
 Charaxes epijasius Reiche, 1850
 Charaxes jasius harrisoni Sharpe, 1904
 Charaxes jasius saturnus Butler, 1866
 Charaxes hansali baringana Rothschild, 1905
 Charaxes hansali kulalae van Someren, 1975
 Charaxes ansorgei ansorgei Rothschild, 1897
 Charaxes ansorgei jacksoni Poulton, 1933
 Charaxes ansorgei loita Plantrou, 1982
 Charaxes eudoxus amaurus Poulton, 1929
 Charaxes overlaeti Schouteden, 1934
 Charaxes bohemani Felder & Felder, 1859
 Charaxes xiphares desmondi van Someren, 1939
 Charaxes xiphares kulal van Someren, 1962
 Charaxes xiphares walwandi Collins, 1989
 Charaxes nandina Rothschild & Jordan, 1901
 Charaxes cithaeron kennethi Poulton, 1926
 Charaxes cithaeron nairobicus van Son, 1953
 Charaxes violetta maritima van Someren, 1966
 Charaxes violetta meru van Someren, 1966
 Charaxes ameliae victoriae van Someren, 1972
 Charaxes achaemenes achaemenes Felder & Felder, 1867
 Charaxes achaemenes monticola van Someren, 1970
 Charaxes jahlusa ganalensis Carpenter, 1937
 Charaxes jahlusa kenyensis Joicey & Talbot, 1925
 Charaxes dilutus ngonga van Someren, 1974
 Charaxes baumanni baumanni Rogenhofer, 1891
 Charaxes baumanni bamptoni van Someren, 1974
 Charaxes baumanni nyiro Collins & Larsen, 1991
 Charaxes baumanni tenuis van Someren, 1971
 Charaxes blanda kenyae Poulton, 1926
 Charaxes ethalion littoralis van Someren, 1967
 Charaxes ethalion marsabitensis van Someren, 1967
 Charaxes ethalion nyanzae van Someren, 1967
 Charaxes viola Butler, 1866
 Charaxes chanleri Holland, 1896
 Charaxes kirki Butler, 1881
 Charaxes aubyni aubyni van Someren & Jackson, 1952
 Charaxes aubyni ecketti van Someren & Jackson, 1957
 Charaxes contrarius van Someren, 1969
 Charaxes guderiana rabaiensis Poulton, 1929
 Charaxes paphianus Ward, 1871
 Charaxes zoolina (Westwood, [1850])

Euxanthini
 Charaxes eurinome (Cramer, 1775)
 Charaxes wakefieldi (Ward, 1873)
 Charaxes tiberius tiberius (Grose-Smith, 1889)
 Charaxes tiberius meruensis (van Someren, 1936)

Nymphalinae
 Vanessula milca (Hewitson, 1873)

Nymphalini
 Antanartia schaeneia (Trimen, 1879)
 Vanessa dimorphica (Howarth, 1966)
 Vanessa abyssinica jacksoni Howarth, 1966
 Junonia artaxia Hewitson, 1864
 Junonia natalica (Felder & Felder, 1860)
 Junonia ansorgei (Rothschild, 1899)
 Salamis cacta cacta (Fabricius, 1793)
 Salamis cacta amaniensis Vosseler, 1907
 Protogoniomorpha anacardii nebulosa (Trimen, 1881)
 Precis actia Distant, 1880
 Precis archesia (Cramer, 1779)
 Precis limnoria taveta Rogenhofer, 1891
 Precis sinuata hecqui Berger, 1981
 Hypolimnas deceptor (Trimen, 1873)
 Hypolimnas monteironis (Druce, 1874)
 Hypolimnas salmacis (Drury, 1773)
 Hypolimnas usambara (Ward, 1872)

Biblidinae

Biblidini
 Byblia anvatara acheloia (Wallengren, 1857)
 Neptidopsis fulgurata platyptera Rothschild & Jordan, 1903
 Eurytela dryope (Cramer, [1775])
 Eurytela hiarbas (Drury, 1782)

Epicaliini
 Sevenia morantii (Trimen, 1881)
 Sevenia natalensis (Boisduval, 1847)
 Sevenia rosa (Hewitson, 1877)

Limenitinae

Limenitidini
 Harma theobene blassi (Weymer, 1892)
 Harma theobene superna (Fox, 1968)
 Cymothoe coranus Grose-Smith, 1889
 Cymothoe teita van Someren, 1939
 Pseudacraea deludens echerioides Talbot, 1941

Neptidini
 Neptis agouale Pierre-Baltus, 1978
 Neptis aurivillii Schultze, 1913
 Neptis gratiosa Overlaet, 1955
 Neptis jordani Neave, 1910
 Neptis katama Collins & Larsen, 1991
 Neptis kikuyuensis Jackson, 1951
 Neptis kiriakoffi Overlaet, 1955
 Neptis lugubris Rebel, 1914
 Neptis nemetes Hewitson, 1868
 Neptis quintilla Mabille, 1890
 Neptis nicoteles Hewitson, 1874
 Neptis nina Staudinger, 1896
 Neptis occidentalis Rothschild, 1918
 Neptis rogersi Eltringham, 1921

Adoliadini
 Euryphura achlys (Hopffer, 1855)
 Euryphura isuka Stoneham, 1935
 Bebearia cocalia badiana (Rbel, 1914)
 Bebearia orientis orientis (Karsch, 1895)
 Bebearia orientis dealbata (Carcasson, 1958)
 Bebearia orientis taveta Clifton, 1980
 Bebearia sophus (Fabricius, 1793)
 Bebearia chriemhilda (Staudinger, 1896)
 Euphaedra zaddachii crawshayi Butler, 1895
 Euphaedra viridicaerulea nitidula van Someren, 1935
 Euphaedra paradoxa Neave, 1904
 Euphaedra rattrayi Sharpe, 1904
 Euphaedra orientalis Rothschild, 1898
 Euphaedra neophron littoralis Talbot, 1929
 Euphaedra neophron ellenbecki Pagenstrecher, 1902
 Euphaedra neophron meruensis van Someren, 1935
 Euptera kinugnana (Grose-Smith, 1889)
 Pseudathyma lucretioides Carpenter & Jackson, 1950
 Pseudathyma nzoia van Someren, 1939

Heliconiinae

Acraeini
 Acraea acara Hewitson, 1865
 Acraea anemosa Hewitson, 1865
 Acraea boopis ama Pierre, 1979
 Acraea chilo Godman, 1880
 Acraea cuva Grose-Smith, 1889
 Acraea endoscota Le Doux, 1928
 Acraea magnifica Carpenter & Jackson, 1950
 Acraea matuapa Grose-Smith, 1889
 Acraea neobule Doubleday, 1847
 Acraea pseudolycia astrigera Butler, 1899
 Acraea rabbaiae Ward, 1873
 Acraea satis Ward, 1871
 Acraea zetes (Linnaeus, 1758)
 Acraea rudolfi Eltringham, 1929
 Acraea zonata Hewitson, 1877
 Acraea acrita Hewitson, 1865
 Acraea petraea Boisduval, 1847
 Acraea pudorina Staudinger, 1885
 Acraea braesia Godman, 1885
 Acraea caecilia caecilia (Fabricius, 1781)
 Acraea caecilia kulal van Someren, 1936
 Acraea caecilia pudora Aurivillius, 1910
 Acraea caldarena caldarena Hewitson, 1877
 Acraea caldarena neluska Oberthür, 1878
 Acraea equatorialis equatorialis Neave, 1904
 Acraea equatorialis anaemia Eltringham, 1912
 Acraea lygus Druce, 1875
 Acraea mirabilis Butler, 1886
 Acraea miranda Riley, 1920
 Acraea natalica Boisduval, 1847
 Acraea pudorella Aurivillius, 1899
 Acraea sykesi Sharpe, 1902 xx
 Acraea adrasta Weymer, 1892
 Acraea aganice montana (Butler, 1888)
 Acraea aganice ugandae (van Someren, 1936)
 Acraea epaea epitellus Staudinger, 1896
 Acraea epaea paragea (Grose-Smith, 1900)
 Acraea umbra hemileuca (Jordan, 1914)
 Acraea althoffi neavei Poulton, 1924
 Acraea ansorgei Grose-Smith, 1898
 Acraea baxteri philos Le Cerf, 1933
 Acraea bonasia (Fabricius, 1775)
 Acraea cabira Hopffer, 1855
 Acraea esebria Hewitson, 1861
 Acraea excelsior Sharpe, 1891
 Acraea pentapolis Ward, 1871
 Acraea rangatana rangatana Eltringham, 1912
 Acraea rangatana ecketti Jackson, 1951
 Acraea viviana Staudinger, 1896
 Acraea anacreontica chyulu van Someren, 1939
 Acraea bomba Grose-Smith, 1889
 Acraea wigginsi Neave, 1904
 Acraea aubyni Eltringham, 1912
 Acraea parrhasia kenya van Someren & Rogers, 1926
 Acraea parrhasia orientis Aurivillius, 1904

Argynnini
 Issoria hanningtoni jeanneli (Bernardi, 1968)

Vagrantini
 Lachnoptera ayresii Trimen, 1879
 Phalanta phalantha aethiopica (Rothschild & Jordan, 1903)

Hesperiidae

Coeliadinae
 Coeliades anchises (Gerstaecker, 1871)
 Coeliades hanno (Plötz, 1879)
 Coeliades keithloa kenya Evans, 1937
 Coeliades keithloa merua Evans, 1947
 Coeliades pisistratus (Fabricius, 1793)
 Coeliades sejuncta (Mabille & Vuillot, 1891)

Pyrginae

Celaenorrhinini
 Celaenorrhinus handmani Collins & Congdon, 1998
 Celaenorrhinus lourentis de Jong, 1976
 Eretis umbra (Trimen, 1862)
 Sarangesa phidyle (Walker, 1870)
 Sarangesa princei Karsch, 1896
 Sarangesa thecla mabira Evans, 1956

Tagiadini
 Eagris decastigma Mabille, 1891
 Caprona adelica Karsch, 1892
 Leucochitonea hindei Druce, 1903
 Abantis meru Evans, 1947
 Abantis paradisea (Butler, 1870)
 Abantis tettensis Hopffer, 1855
 Abantis venosa Trimen & Bowker, 1889

Carcharodini
 Spialia colotes semiconfluens de Jong, 1978
 Spialia colotes transvaaliae (Trimen & Bowker, 1889)
 Spialia confusa obscura Evans, 1937
 Spialia delagoae (Trimen, 1898)
 Spialia depauperata (Strand, 1911)
 Spialia doris (Walker, 1870)
 Spialia kituina (Karsch, 1896)
 Spialia mafa higginsi Evans, 1937
 Spialia mangana (Rebel, 1899)
 Spialia wrefordi Evans, 1951
 Gomalia elma (Trimen, 1862)

Hesperiinae

Aeromachini
 Astictopterus stellata (Mabille, 1891)
 Prosopalpus saga Evans, 1937
 Ampittia capenas (Hewitson, 1868)
 Kedestes brunneostriga (Plötz, 1884)
 Kedestes callicles (Hewitson, 1868)
 Kedestes nancy Collins & Larsen, 1991
 Kedestes nerva paola Plötz, 1884
 Kedestes rogersi Druce, 1907
 Kedestes wallengrenii (Trimen, 1883)
 Gorgyra diva Evans, 1937
 Gorgyra johnstoni (Butler, 1894)
 Gorgyra minima Holland, 1896
 Gorgyra subflavidus Holland, 1896
 Teniorhinus herilus (Hopffer, 1855)
 Ceratrichia semlikensis Joicey & Talbot, 1921
 Acada biseriata (Mabille, 1893)
 Osmodes thora (Plötz, 1884)
 Parosmodes morantii (Trimen, 1873)
 Semalea arela (Mabille, 1891)
 Andronymus neander (Plötz, 1884)
 Chondrolepis telisignata (Butler, 1896)
 Zophopetes nobilior (Holland, 1896)
 Artitropa erinnys ehlersi Karsch, 1896
 Artitropa erinnys radiata Riley, 1925
 Artitropa erinnys vansomereni Riley, 1925
 Artitropa reducta Aurivillius, 1925
 Gretna carmen carmen Evans, 1937
 Gretna carmen capra Evans, 1937
 Leona halma Evans, 1937
 Monza cretacea (Snellen, 1872)
 Platylesches moritili (Wallengren, 1857)
 Platylesches tina Evans, 1937

Baorini
 Borbo fanta (Evans, 1937)
 Borbo ferruginea (Aurivillius, 1925)

Heteropterinae
 Metisella abdeli abdeli (Krüger, 1928)
 Metisella abdeli elgona Evans, 1938
 Metisella formosus (Butler, 1894)
 Metisella quadrisignatus quadrisignatus (Butler, 1894)
 Metisella quadrisignatus nanda Evans, 1937
 Metisella willemi (Wallengren, 1857)
 Metisella midas (Butler, 1894)

See also
 Geography of Kenya
 List of ecoregions in Kenya
 Kakamega Forest

References

 Seitz, A. Die Gross-Schmetterlinge der Erde 13: Die Afrikanischen Tagfalter. Plates
 Seitz, A. Die Gross-Schmetterlinge der Erde 13: Die Afrikanischen Tagfalter. Text (in German)

Butterflies

Kenya
Kenya
Butterflies